The Bishop of St Germans is an episcopal title which was used by Anglo Saxon Bishops of Cornwall and currently in use in the Church of England and in the Roman Catholic Church.

The title is used by suffragan bishops of the Church of England, and is currently used by a suffragan bishop assistant to the Bishop of Truro of the Diocese of Truro. In the Roman Catholic Church,  is a titular see, used as the title for a bishop who is not in charge of a diocese.

The title takes its name after St Germans, a large village in Cornwall. In the 10th and 11th centuries, St Germans Priory was effectively the seat for the bishopric of Cornwall. In 1043, dioceses of Cornwall and Crediton merged under one bishop, and eventually they moved to Exeter in 1050.

List of Anglican bishops

List of Catholic bishops

References

External links
 Crockford's Clerical Directory - Listings

Bishops of St Germans
Anglican suffragan bishops in the Diocese of Truro
Bishops of St Germans